District registry can refer to:

a part of the High Court of Justice situated in various districts of England and Wales dealing with High Court family and civil business
an office of HM Land Registry
a register office